Hyloxalus fuliginosus is a species of frog in the family Dendrobatidae. It may be endemic to Ecuador where it is known from the Amazonian slopes of the Andes in the northern Ecuador, with some sources reporting it from Colombia and Venezuela.

Description

Habitat and conservation
Its natural habitats are cloud forests where it occurs near streams. It is threatened by habitat loss.

References

fuliginosus
Amphibians of Ecuador
Taxa named by Marcos Jiménez de la Espada
Amphibians described in 1871
Taxonomy articles created by Polbot